Buor-Sysy (Buor Sıhıı) is a rural locality (a selo), the only inhabited locality, and the administrative center of Indigirsky National Rural Okrug of Momsky District in the Sakha Republic, Russia, located  from Khonuu, the administrative center of the district. Its population as of the 2010 Census was 387, of whom 198 were male and 189 female, down from 463 recorded during the 2002 Census.

References

Notes

Sources
Official website of the Sakha Republic. Registry of the Administrative-Territorial Divisions of the Sakha Republic. Momsky District. 

Rural localities in Momsky District